Acun Medya, is a Turkish media company founded by Acun Ilıcalı, Esat Yöntunç, Çaykun Ertan, Alpay Kazan, Mustafa Kazan and Evren Çağlar on 27 September, 2006. Acun Ilıcalı who is the owner of the company is also the main host in most shows made by the company.

Acun Medya mainly produces competition programs like Fear Factor, Survivor, Var Misın Yok Musun, Yetenek Sizsiniz Türkiye, O Ses Türkiye and Exathlon. Apart from the programs in Turkey, Acun Medya produces programs in Greece like Survivor Greece, The Voice of Greece, Ellade Eheis Talento, Power of Love and The Masked Singer. On the 19th of January 2022, Acun Medya acquired 100% ownership of English Football Club  Hull City A.F.C, who avoided relegation in their first season with Acun Medya's control.

Channels

Active 

 2013-: TV8
 2014-: TV8 int
 2016-: TV8.5

Closed 

 MNG Shop (Bought form Mapa Group, closed in 2014, replaced by Shop90.)
 Shop90 (Replaced by TV8.5)

Programs

Active 

 Yetenek Sizsiniz Türkiye (2021-)
 O Ses Türkiye Rap (2021-)
 Masterchef Junior (2021-)
 Exatlon Türkiye (2020-)
 Doya Doya Moda (2019-)
 Sağlam Geziyoruz (2019-)
 Masterchef Turkey (2018-)
 Yemekteyiz (2017-)
 Survivor Panorama (2014-)
 O Ses Türkiye (2011-)
 Survivor Turkey (2005-)

Old 

 Acun Firarda (2005)
 Fear Factor (2006-2007)
 Var mısın Yok musun (2007-2010)
 Yoksa Rüya mı? (2007)
 Söyle Söyleyebilirsen (2014)
 Yok Böyle Dans (2010-2011)
 Devler Ligi (2009)
 Survivor Turkey - Greece (2006)
 Survivor Aslanlar - Kanaryalar (2007)
 Survivor Males - Females (2010)
 Survivor Ünlüler - Gönüllüler (2011-2014)
 3 Adam (2013-2017)
 Arda'nın Mutfağı (2014-2018)
 Aileler Yarışıyor (2014)
 Hülya Avşar Show (2014)
 Akademi (2014)
 Kel Alaka (2014)
 Para Bende (2014)
 Ninja Warrior Türkiye (2014)
 Ütopya (2014-2015)
 Ver Fırına (2014-2015)
 İşte Benim Stilim
 Komedi Türkiye (2015)
 En Zayıf Halka (2015)
 Rising Star Türkiye (2015-2016)
 4 Büyükler Salon Turnuvası (2016)
 Göz6 (2016)
 Eser Yenenler Show (2018-2020)

References 

Mass media companies of Turkey
Mass media in Istanbul
Companies established in 2006